Thomas Clark (dates unknown) was an English amateur cricketer who made 9 known appearances in first-class cricket matches from 1787 to 1791.

He was mainly associated with Essex.

References

English cricketers
English cricketers of 1787 to 1825
Essex cricketers
Year of birth unknown
Year of death unknown
Hornchurch Cricket Club cricketers